The Khorasan group, sometimes known simply as Khorasan, is an alleged group of senior al-Qaeda members operating in Syria. The group is reported to consist of a small number of fighters who are all on terrorist watchlists, and coordinates with al-Nusra Front, al-Qaeda's official affiliate in Syria. At an intelligence gathering in Washington, D.C. on 18 September 2014, Director of National Intelligence James Clapper stated that "in terms of threat to the homeland, Khorasan may pose as much of a danger as ISIS."

The term first appeared in news media in September 2014, although the United States had reportedly been keeping track of the group for two years.  By early November 2014, the term had disappeared from political rhetoric. Commentators have stated that the threat the Khorasan Group represented was exaggerated to generate public support for American intervention in Syria, and some have questioned whether the group even exists as a distinct entity.

On 28 May 2015, al-Nusra Front leader Abu Mohammad al-Golani explicitly denied the existence of the supposed Khorasan group.  The al-Nusra Front had received specific orders since at least early 2015 from al-Qaeda leader Ayman al-Zawahiri to cease any activities related to attacking Western targets.

In July 2015, both Muhsin al-Fadhli, said to be the operational leader of the group, and chief bombmaker David Drugeon, were killed by 2 US airstrikes. After their deaths, FBI Director James Comey stated that the Khorasan group had become diminished, and that ISIL was now a bigger threat to the US.

On 15 October 2015, a Coalition airstrike in northwest Syria killed Abdul Mohsen Adballah Ibrahim al Charekh (a.k.a. Sanafi al-Nasr), who was then the highest ranking leader of the Khorasan group. He was the deputy leader of Khorasan before Muhsin al-Fadhli's death.

Beginning in January 2017, it was reported that the US no longer referred to Khorasan fighters specifically, and that US officials no longer attempted to distinguish between Khorasan and al-Nusra Front militants, instead, labeling them all collectively as "al-Qaeda". Around this time, the US significantly increased the number of its airstrikes against al-Nusra Front and other al-Qaeda-affiliated targets.

Name
Khorasan is a historical term for a region corresponding to parts of Uzbekistan, Afghanistan, Turkmenistan, and Iran. The name of the group was coined by intelligence agencies as a reference to the high-ranking Khorasan Shura, a leadership council within al-Qaeda, which many members of the group belong to. United States Central Command, the U.S. Department of Defense military command responsible for operations in Syria and Iraq, described the Khorasan Group name in a 6 November 2014 press release as: "a term used to refer to a network of Nusrah Front and al-Qa'ida core extremists who share a history of training operatives, facilitating fighters and money, and planning attacks against U.S. and Western targets."

Membership
The group is described as "a very small group - dozens of fighters only", composed of experienced jihadis from various countries. The group is believed to be made up of "al-Qaeda core" members, meaning the high-ranking members of al-Qaeda who moved to Pakistan following the 2001 invasion of Afghanistan. An American intelligence source indicated the group numbers about 50 members. Members of the group are said to have worked with bomb-makers from Yemen, including an al-Qaeda affiliated bomb-maker named Ibrahim al-Asiri to target civilian aircraft heading to the United States and other Western targets. Another member of the group was Frenchman David Drugeon; who was thought to have worked as a bombmaker for the group.

According to US officials, the organization is led by Mohammed Islambouli, whose brother Khalid Islambouli assassinated Egyptian President Anwar Sadat in 1981. A senior leader within the group was Muhsin al-Fadhli, a prominent al-Qaeda member who went to Iran after the US invasion of Afghanistan, until he was killed in a U.S. airstrike in Syria in July 2015. He was also in charge of Khorasan's external operations. Another Khorasan Group member, Abu Yusuf Al-Turki, was reported to have been killed on 23 September 2014 by US airstrikes in Syria.

There are indications that some members of the Khorasan Group (including Abu Yusuf Al-Turki) were part of an elite sniper subunit of the al-Nusra Front that was known as the "Wolf Group".

Activities
The group was initially reported to pose an "imminent" threat to the United States, with reports of potential plots involving "a bomb made of a nonmetallic device like a toothpaste container or clothes dipped in explosive material".

Later statements by officials indicated that "there were no known targets or attacks expected in the next few weeks" at the time the US began bombing in Syria. On 5 October 2014, FBI director James Comey stated, "I can't sit here and tell you whether their plan is tomorrow or three weeks or three months from now", but that "we have to act as if it's coming tomorrow."

Criticism of term

A 23 September 2014 article by the Carnegie Endowment for International Peace stated that "the sudden flurry of revelations about the 'Khorasan Group' in the past two weeks smacks of strategic leaks and political spin". The article also stated that "Whatever one decides to call it, this is not likely to be an independent organization, but rather a network-within-the-network, assigned to deal with specific tasks."

In an article in The Intercept, journalists Glenn Greenwald and Murtaza Hussain stated that "There are serious questions about whether the Khorasan Group even exists in any meaningful or identifiable manner", describing reports of the group as "propagandistic and legal rationale" for military intervention.  Similarly, according to an analysis in Conflict News, "the US government made the decision to bomb this Wolf Group of Jabhat Al-Nusra, and then later came up with a way to sell to the public. This strategy ended up in the creation of 'Khorasan' a group which never existed in any form beyond the statements of US officials."

On 27 May 2015, in an exclusive interview with Al Jazeera, the leader of the al-Nusra Front, Abu Mohammed al-Golani, stated that the al-Nusra Front did not have intentions to "target the West", referring to North America and Europe, while warning against Western Coalition airstrikes. He also alleged that "there is nothing called [the] Khorasan group. The Americans came up with it to deceive the public".

American-led intervention

On 23 September 2014, United States Central Command stated that they had conducted eight air strikes against the group's training camps, command and control facilities, and other sites in the area west of Aleppo, Syria. The attacks were ineffective and killed only one or two militants, largely because the members of the group had been warned in advance.

On 6 November 2014, US-led coalition forces bombed targets in the Idlib and Aleppo provinces. Despite US military officials stating that only the Khorasan Group was targeted, local activists and the Syrian Observatory for Human Rights claimed that both Ahrar ash-Sham and Jabhat al-Nusra were also hit. It was later announced that the Khorasan's chief bombmaker David Drugeon was believed to have been killed in the attack, but later reports indicated he was only wounded.

The US carried out a third raid on the group on 13 November 2014.

On 18 November, the Syrian Army ambushed a group of Khorasan militants in the countryside of Latakia in a separate operation. Eleven members of the group were killed and another 13 were wounded or captured. The Kazakh and Chechen field commanders of the unit, along with Burmese and Saudi jihadists, were among the dead. The attack also left seven al-Nusra Front fighters dead.

On 19 November, the US launched another airstrike on Khorasan near Harim, Syria, which struck and destroyed a storage facility associated with the group.

On 1 December 2014, the US carried out another airstrike on Khorasan near Aleppo. On 10 December, the CIA stated that both Muhsin al-Fadhli and David Drugeon, who were both thought dead after US airstrikes, were still alive. Drugeon was said to be badly wounded, and was recuperating in a Khorasan-operated hospital.

On 24 March 2015, it was reported that 17 Khorasan fighters had been killed by US airstrikes targeting the group, since the beginning of the campaign on 22 September 2014.

On 20 May 2015, the US conducted 2 airstrikes on Khorasan targets in the Idlib Province, killing Algerian jihadist Said Arif, who was a US-designated terrorist that had become the military chief of Jund al-Aqsa.

On 1 July 2015, David Drugeon was killed by a US airstrike to the west of Aleppo, though his death was not reported until 11 September 2015.

In late July 2015, the Pentagon claimed that it had killed Muhsin al-Fadhli on 8 July 2015, in an airstrike on a vehicle near Sarmada, Syria. After the death of Muhsin al-Fadli, FBI Director James Comey stated that Khorasan had become "diminished", and that ISIL was now a bigger threat to the US than al-Qaeda or the Khorasan group.

On 18 October 2015, it was reported that Sanafi al-Nasr, the new leader of the Khorasan group, was killed in a US airstrike on 15 October 2015. He was formerly al-Qaeda's chief financial officer, and he was also said to have been the 5th Khorasan senior leader killed by US airstrikes in the last 4 months.

On 3 April 2016, Abu Firas al Suri, al-Nusra's spokesman, and seen as a leading figure within the Khorasan group, was killed in a US airstrike. The airstrike also killed al-Suri's son and 20 other al-Nusra and Jund al-Aqsa militants. Later in the same week, a second airstrike killed several Khorasan militants, including Rifai Ahmed Taha Musa, who attempted to unite Ahrar ash-Sham with al-Nusra Front in January 2016.

On 3 October, a US airstrike killed senior al-Qaeda member Abu Faraj al-Masri, who was a senior commander in Jabhat Fateh al-Sham (al-Nusra's rebranded name at the time), in the Idlib Province. Al-Masri had been a senior figure in al-Nusra's Core al-Qaeda group, or Khorasan group. On 17 October, another US airstrike near Idlib city killed Haydar Kirkan, who was a senior al-Nusra member in charge of facilitating al-Qaeda's external network and planning external attacks from Syria.

On 12 January 2017, a US airstrike near Saraqib killed al-Nusra leaders Abd al-Jalil al-Muslimi, Abu Amas al-Masri, and Abu Ikrimah al-Tunsi, along with 10 or 15 other al-Nusra fighters. This came after an marked increase in US airstrikes on al-Nusra Front beginning in January 2017, at which time the US reportedly dropped the "Khorasan group" label and began referring to all al-Qaeda linked targeted as simply "al-Qaeda".

On 19 January, a US airstrike struck the al-Qaeda Shaykh Sulayman training camp near the town of Darat Izza, killing 110 Jabhat Fateh al-Sham (al-Nusra) fighters. Some Nour al-Din al-Zenki fighters were also killed in the attack. The training camp had been run by both Jabhat Fateh al-Sham and al-Zenki, and had been operational since 2013. By then, US airstrikes had killed more than 150 al-Qaeda militants in Syria, in 2017. Following this airstrike, Jabhat Fateh al-Sham openly engaged in armed clashes with Ahrar al-Sham and other Free Syrian Army groups.

On 26 February, a US airstrike in Al-Mastoumeh, Idlib Province, killed Abu Khayr al-Masri, who was the deputy leader of al-Qaeda. He had been dispatched to Syria by al-Qaeda leader Ayman al-Zawahiri, and was nested in the Khorasan group. The US airstrike also killed another Tahrir al-Sham militant, who was traveling in the same car.

References

Further reading
 
 
 
Analysis: CENTCOM draws misleading line between Al Nusrah Front and Khorasan Group

Jihadist groups in Syria
Anti-government factions of the Syrian civil war
Branches of al-Qaeda